Awatrechus is a genus of beetles in the family Carabidae, containing the following species:

 Awatrechus bisetiger Ueno, 1973
 Awatrechus hygrobius Ueno, 1955
 Awatrechus misatonis Ueno, 2003
 Awatrechus occidentalis Ueno, 2003
 Awatrechus oligotrichus Ueno, 2003
 Awatrechus persimilis Ueno, 1969
 Awatrechus pilosus Ueno, 1957
 Awatrechus religiosus Ueno, 1957
 Awatrechus sancticareae Ueno, 2003
 Awatrechus simplicior Ueno, 2003
 Awatrechus yoshidai Ueno, 1969

References

Trechinae